Wanda Brown Shaw (February 14, 1899 – July 20, 1942) was a clubwoman and teacher of Klamath Falls, Oregon.

Early life
Wanda Brown was born in Stayton, Oregon, on February 14, 1899, the daughter of George L. and Lucy E. Brown, a lifelong resident of Oregon. 

She obtained an A. B. degree from University of Oregon in 1922.

Career

Wanda Brown Shaw was active in club affairs.

She was teacher in Klamath Falls High School. 

She was the president of the Klamath branch of the American Association of University Women.

She was a member of Delphian Society, Daughters of the American Revolution and the Klamath Falls Woman's Library Club.

Personal life
Wanda Brown married James Royal Shaw and they had two children: James "Jimmie" Royal Jr. and Wanda Elizabeth. She lived at 805 Pacific Terrace, Klamath Falls, Oregon.

She died on July 20, 1942, and is buried at Fortmiller mortuary, Albany, in the Shaw family plot.

References

1899 births
1942 deaths
University of Oregon alumni
People from Klamath Falls, Oregon
People from Stayton, Oregon
Educators from Oregon
American women educators
Clubwomen
20th-century American women